The 1908 Central Michigan Normalites football team represented Central Michigan Normal School, later renamed Central Michigan University, as an independent during the 1908 college football season. In their first and only season under head coach Hugh Sutherland, the Central Michigan football team compiled a 4–3 record.

Schedule

References

Central Michigan
Central Michigan Chippewas football seasons
Central Michigan Normalites football